Włodzimierz Antkowiak (born 30 October 1946, in Grudziądz) is a Polish poet and painter.

Notable works
 Przychodzę na stadion tych, którzy cie kochali (poetry, 1975)
 Pewnego dnia na wysokościach (Stories, 1979)
 Po co te gwiazdy (poetry, 1980)
 Brat wszystkich (Stories, 1983)
 Monstra świata (Stories, 1989)
 Nie odkryte skarby, Antkowiak, Włodzimierz, 13-02-04,

References

1946 births
Living people
Polish poets
20th-century Polish painters
20th-century Polish male artists
21st-century Polish painters
21st-century Polish male artists
People from Grudziądz
Polish male painters